Paul Francis Reding (February 14, 1924 – December 8, 1983) was a Canadian prelate who served as the seventh Bishop of Hamilton from November 1973 until his death in 1983.

Career 
During his tenure as bishop, he ordained Thomas Christopher Collins to the priesthood. His resting place is located at Holy Sepulchre Cemetery in  Burlington.

Halton Catholic District School Board has a secondary school in Milton was named in his honour.

References 

1924 births
1983 deaths
Roman Catholic bishops of Hamilton, Ontario
20th-century Roman Catholic bishops in Canada